The Freycinet gauge is a standard governing the dimensions of the locks of some canals, put in place as a result of a law passed during the tenure of Charles de Freycinet as minister of public works of France, dating from 5 August 1879.

Bridges and other structures built across the canals are required to provide  of clearance.

In the late nineteenth and early twentieth centuries many French canals were modernised to conform to the Freycinet standard. By 2001,  of navigable waterways in France corresponded to the Freycinet gauge, accounting for 23% of waterborne traffic.

European Classification 
The Freycinet gauge corresponds to the Classification of European Inland Waterways class I gauge.

References

External links 
 The French article from which this article was translated

Locks (water navigation)